Gregory Martin Itzin (April 20, 1948 – July 8, 2022) was an American character actor of film and television best known for his role as U.S. President Charles Logan in the action thriller series 24.

Early life
Itzin was born in Washington, D.C., the son of Evelyn Loretta (née Smith) and Martin Joseph Itzin. When he was in sixth grade, his family moved to Burlington, Wisconsin, where his father was mayor. Itzin originally intended to become a theater actor, receiving training at the American Conservatory Theater in San Francisco. He acted on many stages across the country.

Career

Television 
Itzin appeared in guest starring roles on various television shows like in the MacGyver episode "Final Approach" (1986). He received a Tony Award nomination for his role in the Pulitzer Prize–winning play The Kentucky Cycle. In the movie Airplane!, Itzin played Religious Zealot #1. He had a small role in The A-Team episode "Wheel of Fortune" as Howard, an accountant at a casino.

In 2005, Itzin joined the cast of 24, halfway through its fourth season, in the recurring role as Vice President Charles Logan. By the following season the character had become President and was expanded to become one of the leading figures in the storyline. Itzin received an Emmy nomination for Outstanding Supporting Actor in a Drama Series for this performance. He didn't have to audition for the role, since he had previously auditioned for a role during the second season of the show, and knew one of the producers. Itzin returned for four episodes in season six. Itzin returned for a story arc during the eighth season of the show to help President Allison Taylor keep the Peace Treaty alive. This resulted in an Emmy nomination for Outstanding Guest Actor in a Drama Series. Somewhat coincidentally, before this role, Itzin played a Presidential Candidate in a commercial for cheese products, who was deemed a "doofus" for not liking cheese.

In 2007, he made a guest appearance as William Adama, Dick Tracy, and a police officer at Randy's Halloween night in an episode of Robot Chicken.

Itzin has held recurring roles on popular TV series such as Friends as Theodore Hannigan, father of Mike Hannigan, Murder One, NCIS, and The Mentalist. He played the head of the unit in the latter for 13 episodes, before leaving to return to 24 for its final season. Itzin also appeared on Night Court, Matlock, Diagnosis: Murder, Jake and the Fatman, The O.C., Beverly Hills, 90210, Judging Amy, Boston Legal, CSI: Crime Scene Investigation, The Practice, The Pretender and the short-lived science fiction series, Firefly. He also portrayed John Ashcroft in the 2003 television movie DC 9/11: Time of Crisis. He had a recurring role on Covert Affairs.

Itzin made his first Star Trek appearance in 1993, in the Star Trek: Deep Space Nine episode "Dax". He became a frequent Star Trek actor, playing five different roles in the various series over the years; his most recent Trek role was Admiral Black in Star Trek: Enterprise. He later guest starred on DS9 again, in the sixth-season episode "Who Mourns for Morn?". He appeared as Doctor Dysek in the episode "Critical Care" in the 7th season of Star Trek: Voyager.

Itzin was a special guest star on the Disney Channel hit show Hannah Montana in the season two episode "Test Of My Love" as a billionaire whose son becomes a romantic interest of Miley's. He hosted ACME: This Week! at the ACME Comedy Theatre on February 23, 2008, appearing in several sketches as well as a short film, "Law and Order: Really Special Victims Unit". Itzin  had a recurring role in seasons 1–4 of USA Network's series, Covert Affairs.

Theater 
On stage, he appeared in numerous theatrical venues across the country, and was a member of the Matrix Theatre Company in Los Angeles, where he acted in award-winning productions of Waiting for Godot, The Homecoming, and The Birthday Party (each earning him an L.A. Drama Critics Circle Award for performance). For his work in the Pulitzer Prize-winning The Kentucky Cycle — which he performed in the world premiere at the Intiman Theatre, Mark Taper Forum, the Kennedy Center, and on Broadway — he received Tony Award and Drama Desk Award nominations.

He appeared on stage as Louis de Rougemont in the world premiere of Donald Margulies' Shipwrecked! An Entertainment at South Coast Repertory, and subsequently revived at the Geffen Playhouse.

In 2010, he appeared as the Earl of Kent in the Antaeus Company's production of King Lear. He won the L.A. Drama Critics Circle Award for this performance.

He was in several radio plays with The L.A. Theatre Works, and played the Archbishop in the Hollywood Theater of the Ear's 2010 audio production of Saint Joan.

Film 
Itzin starred in Fear and Loathing in Las Vegas as a Mint Hotel clerk, who looked and sounded a lot like actor McLean Stevenson on M*A*S*H. He played a psychiatrist in the Lindsay Lohan thriller I Know Who Killed Me and as a prison warden in Law Abiding Citizen.

Personal life, health and death
Itzin and his wife, Judie, whom he married in 1979, had two children.

Itzin had a "major heart attack" in 2015, but was able to continue acting. He died on July 8, 2022, at the age of 74 due to complications during an emergency surgery.

Filmography

Film

Television

References

External links

 
 Gregory Itzin in Shipwrecked! at South Coast Repertory
 Law and Order: Really Special Victims Unit starring Gregory Itzin 

1948 births
2022 deaths
20th-century American male actors
21st-century American male actors
Male actors from Wisconsin
American male film actors
American male stage actors
Place of death missing
American male television actors
People from Burlington, Wisconsin
Male actors from Washington, D.C.
American Conservatory Theater alumni